Noah's Ark is a platform game for the Nintendo Entertainment System produced by British studio Source R&D and published in 1992 by Konami. It was only released in Europe. Unlike most other games based on Biblical content released around the same time, this one was officially approved by Nintendo. It is very loosely based on the biblical story with the same name.

Gameplay
The player controls Noah to rescue different animals across the world. Noah is aided by powerups. Ducks give the player different weapons; some items turn Noah invulnerable, in different form or freeze enemies. During each stage, water slowly rises, typically making him harder to maneuver.

The game takes place on all seven worlds based on continents and time periods (Europe based on ancient Rome, North America based on the Wild West, South America based on Inca Empire, Africa based on ancient Egypt, Antarctica based on Ice age, Oceania based on Prehistoric Australia, and Asia based on China or Heian period) with three stages per continent, thus having 21 stages total. At the end of the two thirds of the stages Noah has to fight a drainplug monster. Every third stage ends with a large boss fight.

See also
Bible Adventures, unlicensed NES game featuring Noah.
Super 3D Noah's Ark, unlicensed Super NES game.

References

External links
 Noah's Ark at GameFAQs
 

1992 video games
Christian video games
Europe-exclusive video games
Konami games
Nintendo Entertainment System games
Nintendo Entertainment System-only games
Noah's Ark in popular culture
Piko Interactive games
Platform games
Puzzle video games
Side-scrolling video games
Video games based on the Bible
Video games developed in the United Kingdom
Video games set in ancient Rome
Video games about time travel
Western (genre) video games
Video games set in Peru
Video games set in Egypt
Video games set in Antarctica
Video games set in prehistory
Video games set in Australia
Video games set in the United States
Video games set in ancient China
Single-player video games